The Latin American video game market has been rapidly growing in the past 10 years. In 2016, the market had already overtaken those in music, magazines and radio.

Population 
Video games draw in a large population in the United States. In 2015, there were 155 million Americans regularly playing video games. Furthermore, Latino Americans are one of fastest growing groups. Latinos are the highest percent to define themselves as gamers which is 19 percent more than Non-Hispanic or Latino whites with 7 percent. In addition, Latino Americans have more chance to buy a game than non-Latinos. and it is increasing.

Not only is the Latino American population increasing, Central America and South America are also the second highest increasing market in the world.

Characters and culture 
Even though North and South America have a huge population of Latino gamers in the world, Latin characters only have 5 percent in games. These are the some of most popular characters: King from Tekken Series, Isabela Keyes from Dead Rising, Dominic Santiago from Gears Of War.

All games have their background, and some are fictitious, and may take place in fantasy worlds. Others may take place on Earth. There are some games that take place in Latin American countries. Phillip Penix-Tadsen includes in his list Call of Duty: Modern Warfare 2 and Tropico 4. Because of their Latin American culture, they like Call of Duty, and FIFA in Brazil because soccer is a major part of the culture in many Latin and South American countries.

For music in Latin American video games, there is no specific trend. There are plenty of songs featured in games by Latin American artists which can be found in the games as well as on YouTube playlists.

Gender and demographics 
The population of people who play video games is very mixed. Additionally, children are not the only ones drawn to video games. There are many adult female and males who play video games. In 2014, women had 48 percent of the population, which is similar to men at 52 percent. Some more statistics are that, 29 percent of video gamers are children who are under 18. There are also 32 percent between 18 and 35 years old. And lastly, in 2014, 39 percent were 35 years or older. These numbers show that every age and gender can get involved in playing video games.

However, everyone plays at different levels. People who usually play are casual players. Female make up 59 percent, which is higher than males at 41 percent. There are two games most females Latin Americans play more than males, that is Super Mario Brothers and Candy Crush. Core players have slightly more males with 52 percent. But the 70 percent of professional gamers are also men.

Gaming design 
When Latin American involved video games are doing well economically, the designs have improved too. However, the Latin American video game designer population is not as high as the players, and not as diverse. Women in general only have 11.5 percent. More importantly, the Latino population only has 2.5 percent, while the white population has 83.3 percent. It could very well explain why games do not have a lot of Latino characters.

But the Latin American communities have developed more and more in the game design realm. For example, GameDev Latinos, a design company, has increased game development. Kingdom Rush is one of the popular games made by Latin Americans. Moreover, the game can show how the designers think, and some of their personal views. Therefore, Mexican developer KaraOculta created a game called Trumpéalo, which is a game that involves throwing item at Trump to make him leave the stage.

Revenue 
In 2016, in Argentina, Brazil, and Mexico alone, $4.1 billion was spent on video games. This is the second highest region in the world for video games. For phones, $1.4 billion will be reached by the end of 2017. Predictions for the future Latin American video game market are that it will generate $6.2 billion between 2012 and 2019, by the end of 2019. Predictions also say that phones and tablets will be used more than computers and consoles, which have an estimated projected revenue of $3 billion, leaving consoles at $1.6 billion, and computers at $1.6 billion as well.

See also
 Video gaming in Brazil
 Video gaming in Colombia

References 

Video game culture
Entertainment in South America
Video games